Louis Moreau-Lislet (Dondon, 7 October 1766 – New Orleans, 3 December 1832) was an American jurist and translator.

He is considered one of the fathers of the Louisiana Civil Code, which he drafted together with James Brown and Edward Livingston. Further, he served as Attorney General of the then Territory of Orleans.

He is interred at the Saint Louis Cemetery No. 1.

Bibliography 
 Old Families of Louisiana, par Stanley Clisby, Arthur,George Campbell, et Huchet de Kernion

References

1766 births
1832 deaths
People of Saint-Domingue
American jurists
American translators
American people of French descent
Louisiana Attorneys General